Turkman Bareh, alternatively spelled Barih, is a town in northern Aleppo Governorate, northwestern Syria. Nearby localities include Dabiq  to the west and Akhtarin  to the south. In the 2004 census, Turkman Bareh had a population of 1,537 with a dominative Syrian Turkmen majority.

The town has been in close proximity to sustained fighting in the Syrian civil war.

References

Villages in Aleppo Governorate